Sisowath Monipong (25 August 1912 – 31 August 1956) was the second son of the former King of Cambodia, Sisowath Monivong and Princess Norodom Kanviman Norleak Tevi. He took part in Cambodian politics during and after World War II.

Biography 
He began his studies in Cambodia, before being sent to France, in Grasse then in Nice, from 1927, under the control of the Governor of Indochina, François Marius Baudoin. Back to Cambodia in 1930, he spent a whole year at the monastery of Vatt Botum Vaddey in Phnom Penh.

The year after, the prince went back to France, where he eventually entered the prestigious academy of École spéciale militaire de Saint-Cyr-Coëtquidan. In 1939, he joined the French Air Force and took part in military operations until June 1940. After his father's death on 23 April 1941, his nephew, King Norodom Sihanouk, nominated him as "Preah Ang Krom Luong" on 2 May 1941.

From 1941 on, Prince Sisowath Monipong participated actively in Cambodian politics. He was appointed Royal Delegate for Health, Sports and Economy and in 1946, he was designated Minister of National Education in the government led by his eldest brother, Prince Samdech Krom Preah Sisowath Monireth. In May 1949, he was made Director General of Services in the Royal Palace and, in November 1949, represented Cambodia in Paris for the signature of the first treaty between France and Cambodia, as part of the Union Française. Eventually, in 1950, he was appointed Prime Minister (1 June 1950 – 3 March 1951).

In 1955, after the abdication of Norodom Sihanouk and the nomination of King Norodom Suramarit and of Her Majesty Samdech Preah Mahaksatriyani Queen Sisowath Kosamak Nearirâth Serey Vatthana, his elder sister, prince Sisowath Monipong was appointed Ambassador of Cambodia in Paris, where he died of a heart attack on 31 August 1956. His funeral took place in Phnom Penh a couple of years after, following the ancient tradition of the Khmer monarchy. His ashes were deposited by his eldest son, Prince Sisowath Samyl Monipong in the stupa of king Sisowath Monivong, on the holy hill of Phnom Preah Reach Troap in Oudong.

Private life 
Prince Sisowath Monipong had 5 wives and 13 children:

 from Neak Moneang Andrée Lambert :
 Prince Sisowath Samyl Monipong (11 April 1941-2020)
 from Neak Moneang Phit Sopheak Samosan Chhomya :
 Princess Sisowath Pongsirya (23 February 1942 – 1975)
 Prince Sisowath Monisisowath (20 January 1943 – 1975)
 Princess Sisowath Moniringsy (6 February 1944)
 from Mam Duong Monirak Ous :
 Princess Sisowath Lysa (20 November 1942 – 1975)
 from Neak Moneang Son Sunneary :
 Princess Sisowath Sovethvong (17 September 1945 – 1994)
 Princess Sisowath Pongneary (29 May 1947)
 Princess Sisowath Monisophea (1 June 1949 – 1975)
 Prince Sisowath Duong Daravong (10 August 1950 – 1974)
 from Neak Moneang Chan Sorey :
 Prince Sisowath Reymoni (23 June 1952 - 1975)
 Princess Sisowath Siviman (8 May 1953 - 1975)
 Princess Sisowath Phuong Nara Sylvia (9 November 1954)
 Princess Sisowath Ponnirath (25 September 1956 - 1975)

References 

1912 births
1956 deaths
20th-century Cambodian politicians 
Cambodian diplomats 
Cambodian expatriates in France 
Ambassadors of Cambodia to France 
People from Phnom Penh
Prime Ministers of Cambodia 
Cambodian princes
House of Sisowath
French Air and Space Force personnel
French military personnel of World War II
Soldiers of the French Foreign Legion
Sons of kings